Amphidromus haematostoma is a species of air-breathing tree snail (an arboreal gastropod mollusk in the family Camaenidae.)

Distribution 
The species (Amphidromus haematostoma) is found in South Laos.

Habitat 
The species (Amphidromus haematostoma) is found in trees in the South Laos.

References 

haematostoma
Gastropods described in 1898